Mount Hleven is the ice-covered peak rising to 1574 m in Bangey Heights on the east side of the main ridge of north-central Sentinel Range in Ellsworth Mountains, Antarctica.  It surmounts Padala Glacier to the west, lower Embree Glacier to the north and lower Kopsis Glacier to the southeast.

The peak is named after Hleven Peak in Pirin Mountain, Bulgaria

Location
US mapping in 1961 and 1988.

See also
 Mountains in Antarctica

Maps
 Vinson Massif.  Scale 1:250 000 topographic map.  Reston, Virginia: US Geological Survey, 1988.
 Antarctic Digital Database (ADD). Scale 1:250000 topographic map of Antarctica. Scientific Committee on Antarctic Research (SCAR). Since 1993, regularly updated.

Notes

References
 Mount Hleven. SCAR Composite Gazetteer of Antarctica.
 Bulgarian Antarctic Gazetteer. Antarctic Place-names Commission. (details in Bulgarian, basic data in English)

External links
 Mount Hleven. Copernix satellite image

Ellsworth Mountains
Bulgaria and the Antarctic
Mountains of Ellsworth Land